Yeh Jo Hai Zindagi (literal meaning: 'Such is Life') is a sitcom that aired on DD National in 1984. It was written by comedy writer Sharad Joshi and directed by Kundan Shah, S. S. Oberoi and Raman Kumar.

Plot
The episodes revolved around funny happenings in the lives of Ranjit Verma (played by actor Shafi Inamdar) and Renu Verma (played by actress Swaroop Sampat (Femina Miss India 1979), who play a married couple along with Renu's unmarried and unemployed younger brother Raja (Rakesh Bedi) and then Chachi's daughter who plays the character of Rashmi. Other characters were Ranjit's boss (Tiku Talsania), his Bengali neighbours (actors Vijay Kashyap and Sulabha Arya), etc.

A trademark of the Yeh Jo Hai Zindagi were the characters played by Satish Shah from Episode 1 to Episode 54. In each episode, Shah played a different character who played a key role in the plot. These characters would be from many professions and regions of India, with some being close family friends of the Vermas and others being total strangers. During the period 1984-86 Satish was anointed as "King of Comedy" by the entertainment media as a direct consequence of the multitude of characters that he played on the show.

In few episodes from 40, Anjan Srivastav, Avtaar Gill, Pawan Malhotra, Ashok Pandit played different characters.

Production
The first 24 episodes of the show has focus on Ranjit, Renu and Raja and their neighbours Mr. Bhattacharya and Mandira, with various characters played by Satish Shah.

After several highly successful shows, Shafi Inamdar (who played Ranjit) left after Episode 24 due to his film commitments. Episode 25 to 44 had focus on Raja, his Chachi and her servant.

However, with the huge popularity of Yeh Jo Hai Zindagi, a repackaged second attempt was made with the underlying idea that Ranjit and Renu have moved abroad because of his work, while Raja is still staying with Ranjit's aunt, played by the legendary actress Farida Jalal, her daughter Rashmi (Kamia Malhotra) and a servant, played by Javed Khan.

Ranjit and Renu return from Episode 45 onwards and act till Episode 55 of Raja s marriage with Rekha. The  characters played by Satish Shah were constant factor from Episode 1 to 55.  The second season retained the fame of the first season.
Raja's love life and affair with Rekha (Nivedita) was the new center of activity. The third innings had a reasonably  shorter run from episode 55 to 67. It focused on the household life of Mr  Gupta, Raja and Rekha after marriage. 

The alumni of this show went on to have chequered careers in Indian and other cinema over the years.

List of episodes

Cast
 Shafi Inamdar as Ranjit Verma, the husband
 Swaroop Sampat as Renu Verma, Ranjit's wife
 Rakesh Bedi as Raja, Renu's brother
 Satish Shah as different character in each episode.
 Nivedita Joshi-Saraf as Rekha, Raja's Wife in Season 3
 Tiku Talsania as  Raghuwan Kailash Gupta a.k.a. R.K. Gupta, Ranjit's boss (and later Raja's father in law)
 Farida Jalal as Ranjit's aunt Season 2.
 Sulbha Arya as Mandira Bhattacharya, Bengali neighbour
 Vijay Kashyap as Tarun Bhattacharya, Bengali neighbour in Season1-2/ Ravi, Raja's  Brother-in-law in Season 3 
 Kiran Juneja as Ranjana, Ravi's Girlfriend in Season 3
 Reena Wadhwa as Rashmi, the daughter of Ranjit's Aunt
 Javed Khan Amrohi as Jhumru the servant in Season 2
 Aanjjan Srivastav as Various Characters
 Jatin Kanakia as Rekha's Uncle
 Pavan Malhotra as Police Constable in episode 58
 Kishori Ballal as Groom's Mother in episode 4 & 5
 Avtar Gill as Various Characters
 Salim Ghouse as Mr Venkat
 Rekha Sabnis as Mrs Venkat

See also
 List of Hindi comedy shows 
 List of programs broadcast by DD National

References

External links
 

Hindi comedy shows
Indian television sitcoms
DD National original programming
1980s Indian television series
1984 Indian television series debuts
1986 Indian television series endings